This is a complete list of bridges and dams that span the Kiskiminetas River from its confluence at the Conemaugh River and Loyalhanna Creek to its mouth at the Allegheny River.

Crossings

Crossings of the Kiskiminetas River
Kiskiminetas